Cesare Caramelli (born 26 October 1938) is an Italian former swimmer who competed in the 1964 Summer Olympics.

References

1938 births
Living people
Italian male swimmers
Italian male breaststroke swimmers
Olympic swimmers of Italy
Swimmers at the 1964 Summer Olympics
Mediterranean Games gold medalists for Italy
Mediterranean Games medalists in swimming
Swimmers at the 1963 Mediterranean Games
20th-century Italian people